Hüseyin Rauf Orbay (27 July 1881 – 16 July 1964) was an Ottoman-born Turkish naval officer, statesman and diplomat of Abkhaz origin.

Biography 

Hüseyin Rauf was born in Constantinople in 1881 to an Abkhazian family. As an officer in the Ottoman Navy, he achieved fame for his actions as the captain of the cruiser Hamidiye during the First Balkan War. He was Chief of Naval Staff during World War I and by October 1918 was Minister of Marine and led the delegation that signed the Armistice of Mudros. Rauf Orbay also played a role in assisting Mustafa Kemal Atatürk in a near court-martial during a feud with Djemal Pasha and Enver Pasha.
On 31 October 1918, he signed the Armistice of Mudros as the Minister of Navy, which ended the Ottoman Empire's participation in World War I. When the Turkish War of Independence began, he resigned from his position and went to Ankara to collaborate with Mustafa Kemal Atatürk. He was elected as a member of the representative committee in the Congress of Erzurum on 23 July 1919. He joined the Congress of Sivas as a delegate for Sivas on 4 September 1919 and was elected deputy chairman.

When the War of Independence ended he became the first Prime Minister of the new provisional Government of the Grand National Assembly on 11 August 1922. In 1924, he was one of the founders of the Terakkiperver Cumhuriyet Fırkası (Progressive Republican Party) at the request of Atatürk as part of Atatürk's attempt to begin the tradition of multiparty democracy in the young Republic, in opposition to Atatürk's Republican People's Party. When this party was closed down in 1925 after Atatürk found that Islamist reactionaries had infiltrated its ranks, Rauf went to exile in Europe for 10 years. Later, he was cleared of all accusations and became a member of the Turkish parliament.
During World War II, Rauf Orbay was the Turkish ambassador in London, helping keep Turkey out of the war. He always firmly believed in the Republic of Turkey and always stated that Mustafa Kemal Atatürk was the only person who could have organised and led the transformation of the crumbling Ottoman Empire into modern Turkey.

Autobiography
Cehennem Değirmeni ("Windmill of Hell"), Emre Publishing, September 1993

References

 Rauf Orbay, Siyasi Hatiralar, Örgün Yayinevi, İstanbul, 2003.

External links 
 
 Mustafa Alkan, "Hüseyin Rauf Orbay’ın Hayatı (1880-1964)", Atatürk Araştırma Merkezi Dergisi, Sayı 59, Cilt: XX, Temmuz 2004, 
 Kafkas Foundation 

1881 births
1964 deaths
20th-century prime ministers of Turkey
Diplomats from Istanbul
Military personnel from Istanbul
Turkish people of Abkhazian descent
Ottoman Naval Academy alumni
Ottoman Navy officers
Ottoman military personnel of the Italo-Turkish War
Ottoman military personnel of the Balkan Wars
Ottoman military personnel of World War I
Members of the Special Organization (Ottoman Empire)
People of the Turkish War of Independence
Malta exiles
Members of Kuva-yi Milliye
Prime Ministers of Turkey
Ambassadors of Turkey to the United Kingdom
Progressive Republican Party (Turkey) politicians
Politicians from Istanbul